Gaheris  (Old French: Gaheriet, Gaheriés, Guerrehes) is a knight of the Round Table in the chivalric romance tradition of Arthurian legend. A nephew of King Arthur, Gaheris is the third son of Arthur's sister or half-sister Morgause and her husband Lot, King of Orkney and Lothian. He is the younger brother of Gawain and Agravain, the older brother of Gareth, and half-brother of Mordred. Le Morte d'Arthur depicts Gaheris as little more than a supporting character to Gawain, with an odd exception of his murder of their mother. His role is greater in the French prose cycles, including as an object of murderous sibling rivalry by Agravain in the Vulgate Cycle. Inevitably, however, he is killed alongside Gareth during Lancelot's rescue of Guinevere, the event that will lead to the fall of Arthur.

Origin 
Gaheris and his brother Gareth likely originated from the same character, due to the similarity of their names in Old French (the forms of their names include the almost entirely exact Guerrehes and Guerrehet, respectively). Furthermore, the adventures ascribed to the brothers are often interchangeable and indistinguishable. Only one brother is ever named for Gwalchmai ap Gwyar, the figure from Welsh mythology traditionally identified with Gawain. This character (a prince named Gwalchafed, Gwalhafed, or Gwalhauet [Gwalhavet], Old Welsh for "Hawk of Summer"), mentioned in Culhwch and Olwen, is a likely common source for both Gaheris and Gareth, if Gawain was indeed derived from Gwalchmai. The later, French-inspired Welsh romance Seint Greal calls Gwalchmei's brother Gaharyet.

Medieval literature

Early appearances in French and German poetry
In continental literature, Gaheris' name is first found as Gaheriet on the list of King Arthur's knights in the French poem Erec and Enide, written in the late 12th century by Chrétien de Troyes. He again appears in Chrétien's later Perceval, the Story of the Grail, which describes him as a son of King Lot and one of younger brothers of Gawain.

In the German poem Parzival, he is instead one of Gawain's cousins, named Gaherjet. Der Pleier's Meleranz mentions Gaharet (also rendered as Kaheret in his Tandareis and Flordibel), a son of Arthur's sister Anthonje and the unnamed King of Gritenland, as one of the cousins of Gawain (Gawan), along with the protagonist Meleranz. As Karjet (Karyet), he appears in Lanzelet, helping Lancelot rescue Guinevere from the abduction by King Valerin.

French cyclical prose and foreign adaptations
The Lancelot-Grail (Vulgate Cycle) of the early 13th century is the first known work to feature Gaheris as a major character. In the prose Lancelot, Gaheris is described as valiant, agile, and handsome (even as "his right arm was longer than the left"), but reticent in speech and prone to excess when angered. As such, he "was the least well-spoken of all his peers." Nevertheless, it tells how the nobles of the kingdom of Orkney (Orcanie), which his father King Lot had ruled when he was alive, attempt to have the kingdom given to Gaheris, whom they thought better fitted to be their king than any of his brothers (Gaheris, however, refuses to be crowned until at least after the end of the quest of the Holy Grail). The prose Merlin, too, describes him as the best warrior among Gawain's brothers and at least equal to Gawain himself. 

The teenage Gaheris, together with Gawain and Agravain, defects from Lot and aids Arthur in the early wars against the rebels kings as well as the Saxons (substituted by the Saracens in some English versions such as Arthour and Merlin), especially distinguishing himself in fighting against the latter. Following their early battlefield feats, all three of them are knighted at once by Arthur in the Vulgate Cycle, however Gaheris is the first of the Orkney clan to be knighted in the later rewrite known as the Post-Vulgate Cycle. In the Post-Vulgate Merlin, when Gaheris is given flowers sent by the Queen of the Fairy Isle, it is prophesied that he would surpass in goodness and valor all the Knights of the Round Table save for two (presumably Galahad and Lancelot) were it not for the death of his mother, which Gaheris is destined to cause through his sin. The young knight then sets out in the quest to save Gawain and Morholt, during which he is twice attacked by his envious brother Agravain but soundly defeats him on each occasion. He eventually rescues both Gawain and Morholt, later accompanying the latter to Ireland.

Through the prose cycles, Gaheris then fights in Arthur's further wars against various enemies. He also often participates in his elder brother Gawain's chivalric adventures, in addition to these of his own such as his rescue of King Bagdemagus. Some of these episodes are retold in Thomas Malory's compilation Le Morte d'Arthur, where Gaheris (also written as Gaherys or Gaheryes) is at first a squire to Gawain, whose fiery temper he helps moderate during their adventures, prior to being knighted himself. Gaheris later marries the haughty damsel Lynette, a sister of his younger brother Gareth's wife Lyonors. The Lancelot and the Mort Artu (Death of Arthur) sections of the Lancelot-Grail cycle differ in their characterisation of Gaheris in relation to Gawain. In the Lancelot, their youngest full brother Gareth is Gawain's most cherished sibling. In the Mort Artu, it is instead Gaheris and his death anguishes Gawain profoundly.

In the Post-Vulgate tradition (including Malory's telling), Gaheris takes part in the revenge killing of King Pellinore, the slayer of King Lot. More notorious is his beheading of his own mother Queen Morgause after catching her in flagrante delicto with Lamorak, Pellinore's handsome son and one of the greatest knights of Arthur. Lamorak is allowed to escape but is later hunted down alone by Gaheris with three of the other Orkney brothers (except Gareth), who believe Lamorak was the one who killed their mother. They ambush and fight him together, the act that is deemed cowardly and a blot on their honour, until his young half-brother Mordred stabs him in the back. When Arthur discovers that Gaheris is Morgause's real murderer, he is banished from the high king's court. Gaheris is then about to be beheaded in revenge for their mother's death by Mordred and Agravain, but Gareth convinces Gawain to order them to stop. Following his exile, Gaheris re-appears on the Grail Quest as a companion of Perceval after being rescued by Palamedes from captivity.

In the Prose Tristan, Gaheris is a friend of the eponymous protagonist Tristan, supporting him against the evil King Mark and forcing Mark to rescind Tristan's own banishment from Cornwall. The narrative of Tristan has Gaheris as a far better knight than Gawain who here is villainized. Its Belarusian version  features him as Arthur's own son (rather than a nephew) by the name Garnot. In Malory's telling, however, Gaheris hates Tristan for being favoured by Arthur and is his sworn enemy. When Gaheris and Agravain meet and attack Tristan, the Cornish knight calls them and Gawain "the greatest destroyers and murderers of good knights" in the realm before fighting them off.

His death during Lancelot's rescue of Queen Guinevere from being burned at the stake is related in the Mort Artu, the final volume of the Vulgate and Post-Vulgate prose cycles. While Gawain and Gareth will have nothing to do with Agravain and Mordred's plot to entrap Lancelot and Guinevere (in the English verse translation Stanzaic Morte Arthur, Gaheris too sides with them), Arthur asks the all brothers of Mordred to help guard the queen's execution. Gaheris and Gareth reluctantly agree, though Gawain refuses. When Lancelot rushes to save the woman whom he loves, he cuts down the two Orkney princes. As told in the Vulgate Mort Artu, Gaheris manages to kill Meliadus the Black, but then his helmet is knocked off by Lancelot's half-brother Hector de Maris, after which his head is split by Lancelot himself. Their surviving brother Gawain's fury is terrible and the resulting new blood feud leads to the destruction of Arthur's kingdom.

Different characters by this name
In the Post-Vulgate version of the Mort Artu, a knight from North Wales also named Gaheris takes the vacant Round Table seat that had belonged to Gaheris of Orkney after the death of the latter. That "new" Gaheris (Gaheres de Norgales) participates in the resulting civil war, fighting on Arthur and Gawain's side against Lancelot's followers. To further confusion, there is also Gaheris of Karaheu, another Knight of the Round Table. Both of them are entirely distinct from Gaheris the brother of Gawain.

Modern culture
 T. H. White's The Once and Future King attributes the act of matricide to Agravaine instead of Gaheris. White gives his own individual interpretation to the story, depicting Agravaine as having an unhealthy love/lust obsession for his own mother, and repeatedly describes Gaheris as "dull" or "dull-witted". 
 In Gerald Morris' book series The Squire's Tales, Gaheris is one of the main heroes. He is portrayed as a witty, quietly brave man who prefers agriculture to sword fighting.
 In the 1995 film First Knight, Gaheris is portrayed by Alexis Denisof. He participates at the final battle for Camelot and survives against Malagant and his army.

Notes

References

External links
Gaheris at The Camelot Project

Arthurian characters
Fictional matricides
Fictional princes
King Arthur's family
Knights of the Round Table